Heinrich Brändli (April 18, 1938 – April 12, 2018) was a Swiss engineer and professor of ETH Zürich. He dealt with transportation and railway technology.

References

1938 births
2018 deaths
Swiss engineers
Academic staff of ETH Zurich
People from Hinwil District